Gymnogramma dealbata is the name of a plant species. It may refer to:

Pityrogramma dealbata, described in 1825 as Gymnogramma dealbata C.Presl
Argyrochosma dealbata, described in 1859 as Gymnogramma dealbata (Pursh) Nutt. ex Mett.

Ferns